Ghost is a musical with book and lyrics by Bruce Joel Rubin and music and lyrics by Dave Stewart and Glen Ballard.

Based on the hit 1990 romantic fantasy thriller film of the same name, the musical had its world premiere at the Manchester Opera House in Manchester in March 2011. Ghost then began its West End premiere in summer 2011, opening on 19 July. A Broadway transfer opened in April 2012. It toured the UK in 2013, after the London production closed in October 2012.

The plot centres on lovers Sam and Molly, who are attacked as they are returning to their apartment. When Sam dies he becomes caught between the real world and the next. Molly is in danger and Sam cannot leave her. A medium, Oda Mae Brown, helps Sam to get in touch with Molly to warn her.

Plot

Act I
The musical starts when Sam Wheat and his long-time girlfriend, Molly Jensen, move into a loft apartment in Brooklyn together ("Here Right Now"). Sam is a banker, Molly a sculptor, and their friend Carl Bruner is introduced as one of Sam's co-workers, come to help them settle in. The three of them seem to be a tight-knit group, with Sam and Molly very much in love. However, Sam clearly shies away from the word "love", which makes Molly visibly uncomfortable. She starts to say something about it, but soon stops herself, and Sam distracts her with a rendition of "Unchained Melody," leaving her insecurities temporarily forgotten.

At work, Sam notices some discrepancies with several accounts and is unwilling to let them go, despite the fact that he has a date with Molly that evening ("More"). He confides in Carl with his discovery, and his friend not only agrees to keep the findings a secret, but promises to investigate himself, so Sam can keep his date. Thanking him, Sam leaves, and meets up with Molly, who later confesses that she wants to marry him. Sam is taken aback and Molly suddenly asks why he never tells her that he loves her ("Three Little Words"); he assures Molly that he doesn't say it in so many words because he prefers to say it through his actions. Molly tells him that she'd still like to hear it every now and again, but his reply reassures her nonetheless. However, they're soon approached by an armed man that tries to steal Sam's wallet. Sam fights back instead of surrendering, and the two struggle for the gun. It goes off and Sam is fatally shot, leaving Molly to cry out for help. Instead of moving on, however, Sam becomes a ghost, and he stays behind with Molly instead of following the light; unable to leave Molly, he follows her to the hospital, and another ghost explains what he's become ("Ball of Wax"). A trapped Sam struggles to reach out to Molly ("I Can't Breathe").

Back at the apartment, Carl helps Molly clear out some of Sam's old things; clearly, she's hesitant to let go, totally unbeknownst to the fact that Sam is very close by, unable to move on himself. When she's alone, the man that killed Sam sneaks in and begins to ransack the place while Molly is upstairs, forcing Sam into a panic that he'll hurt her, too. Sam manages to spook the man and he flees. Needing to know who he is, Sam pushes himself through the front door with great effort, and follows the man all the way back to his own apartment. He finds out that the man's name is Willie Lopez, and that he'd eventually go back for what he was looking for. Desperate, Sam then seeks out a psychic, Oda Mae Brown, who seems to be a total fraud ("Are You a Believer?"). By some miracle, she actually hears Sam, and he convinces her to go talk to Molly on his behalf - by singing '10,000 Bottles of Beer on the Wall' obnoxiously, no less. In the meantime, Molly is grieving and not taking the loss very well ("With You"). She gets a visit from Oda Mae, but Molly is hesitant to believe, until Oda Mae starts parroting things that only Sam would know. Eventually, she comes around, and agrees to listen. Through Oda Mae, Sam tells her that he was set up, murdered, and that she needs to go to the police; Oda Mae bails as soon as she hears the word. Molly takes this information to Carl, who tells her that it's crazy, but promises to check it out. She goes to the police and Carl goes straight to Willie's place where a distraught Sam discovers the truth, in that his murder to hide Carl's financial misdeeds. As Molly swears to suspend all disbelief, a drunken Carl wanders the streets trying to convince himself it was not his fault ("Suspend My Disbelief/I Had a Life").

Act II
At the police station, it's revealed that Oda Mae has quite the criminal record. Shaken, Molly leaves there with the knowledge that the psychic is a fraud and she loses hope, much to Sam's dismay ("Rain/Hold On"). Molly in her anger sits down to do some pottery as the radio plays. Static is heard and Molly gets up to change to station, as she turns the dial "Unchained Melody" is suddenly heard. Molly quickly turns off the radio in shock. After a moments pause she turns it back on and slowly returns to her pottery. Sam, who is watching, approaches her from behind singing along, longing for her touch. Just as Molly begins frustrated and starts to lean back as if she can feel Sam, there is a knock on the door. It's Carl. Molly tells Carl that he was right, that the whole thing was crazy, and that she was just grasping at straws. He assures her that it's only natural, but she has to move on, and he even makes a poorly received move on her ("Life Turns on a Dime"). Enraged, Sam manages to break something, and a flustered Molly asks Carl to leave.

With the help of another ghost on the subway, Sam learns how to move objects ("Focus") and returns to Oda Mae's place to enlist her help once more ("Talkin' Bout a Miracle"). Suddenly, Oda Mae is a legitimate psychic, with the ability to call on other spirits instead of resorting to fraud. While Sam is there, Willie Lopez finds her, and she has to run for her life. Sam uses his newfound abilities to spook him and chase him away, but Willie runs into traffic and dies. Unlike Sam, he is not offered a white light, but it's implied that he's dragged somewhere completely different. However, Sam knows that it isn't over, and he begs Oda Mae to help him stop Carl from getting to the money, in order to protect Molly.

We then see Molly, trying to get her life together and move on ("Nothing Stops Another Day"); it's seen that she's selling pieces at her gallery and she apologizes to Carl for pushing him away. Carl, meanwhile, is anxiously awaiting a call and waves her off under the guise of having a busy day. Together, Sam and Oda Mae break into the account that Carl was extorting, Sam feeding her account numbers and information while she poses as 'Rita Miller.' The account is closed and Sam goes to find Carl in his office, in a panic. Moving objects around the room, Sam scares Carl, moving objects around again and making it clear that he knows what really happened. Scared, Carl tells Sam that he'll kill Molly if he doesn't leave him alone and get him the money. However, Sam runs back to Oda Mae.

When she's handed a check for around four million dollars, Oda Mae tries to take the money and leave the situation for good ("I'm Outta Here"), but Sam convinces her to donate the money. Sam then takes her to go see Molly again in order to warn her about Carl. At the apartment, Molly tries to send her away at first, but Sam is able to walk through the door and tell Oda Mae the significance of the earrings Molly is wearing, as well as read a letter for Sam that Molly has inside the apartment. After Oda Mae repeats these things, Molly is able to believe again, and she lets the psychic in. She explains everything to Molly, who is clearly emotionally distraught, and Oda Mae even lets Sam use her body to hold Molly and comfort her ("Unchained Melody (Dance)")

Carl comes into the apartment, armed and frightened for his own life; he owes dangerous drug dealers money and he's desperate. Even though it's clear that he doesn't want to resort to such measures, Carl grabs Molly and holds his gun to her, telling Sam that if he doesn't have Oda Mae tell him where the money is, he's going to kill her. There's a struggle, and Carl is killed, and he's dragged away in the same way as Willie.

Now that Carl is gone and Molly is safe, the light returns for Sam and Molly is able to see and hear him. Knowing that it's time for him to go, Sam says goodbye to Oda Mae, and regretfully turns to Molly. They're able to say their goodbyes, Sam finally telling Molly that he loves her in the way that she wants to hear ("Finale").

Productions

Manchester (2011)
The musical had a world premiere try-out at the Manchester Opera House, Manchester, England with performances beginning 28 March 2011 and running through 14 May 2011. It was directed by Tony Award-winning director Matthew Warchus, with set and costume design by Rob Howell, choreography by Ashley Wallen, musical supervision and arrangements by Christopher Nightingale, illusions by Paul Kieve, lighting by Hugh Vanstone, sound design by Bobby Aitken and projection design by Jon Driscoll.

Cast members included Richard Fleeshman as Sam Wheat, Caissie Levy as Molly Jensen, Sharon D. Clarke as Oda Mae Brown and Andrew Langtree as Carl Bruner.

West End (2011–2012)
The production began previews at the Piccadilly Theatre in the West End on 24 June 2011, with an official opening night gala on 19 July. Reviews for the opening night performance were mixed, although the special effects were praised by critics for their ingenuity and skill. On 13 January 2012, Mark Evans and Siobhan Dillon took over in the roles of Sam and Molly respectively. The production closed on 6 October 2012.

Broadway (2012)
The musical opened on Broadway at the Lunt-Fontanne Theatre on 23 April 2012, following previews from 15 March Directed by Matthew Warchus, original stars Richard Fleeshman and Caissie Levy reprised their roles, with newcomers Da'Vine Joy Randolph (Oda Mae) and Bryce Pinkham (Carl).

According to Levy, "[For the Broadway production], emotional moments in the show have been fine-tuned, a line or two has been changed here or there...a couple of songs have been replaced, some characters have been tweaked. All for the better." A new "Overture" was added, and "Ball of Wax" has been replaced by a new, but similar song, "You Gotta Let Go".

The production opened to mixed reviews, although it received three Tony Award nominations. Randolph was nominated for the Outer Critics Circle Award for Outstanding Featured Actress in a Musical, while Hugh Vanstone won the award for Outstanding Lighting Design. It was announced on 24 July 2012, that the Broadway production would close on 18 August 2012 after 136 regular performances. A national tour for fall 2013 was confirmed.

UK National Tour (2013–2014)
The first UK Tour opened in Cardiff on 10 April 2013, and despite some technical faults, opened to positive reviews. London understudy Rebecca Trehearn stepped into the role of Molly, with Stewart Clarke as Sam, Wendy Mae Brown as Oda Mae and David Roberts as Carl. The 11-month tour closed as scheduled on 8 March 2014 in Oxford.

Germany (2017–2020)
The musical had the German premiere in Berlin at the Theater des Westens at the 7 December 2017. Alexander Klaws and Willemijn Verkaik took over in the roles of Sam and Molly respectively. Ghost played 348 times until 7 October 2018. The musical received four awards at the "Broadway World Awards 2018".

International Tour (2018) and UK National Tour (2019)
In October 2018, the musical played internationally in Dubai, Istanbul and Trieste. Rebekah Lowings and Nial Sheehy played the roles of the heartbroken Molly and ghost Sam. The Bill Kenwright production then toured the whole of the UK, starting on 8 January 2019 at Churchill Theatre, Bromley. Lowings said, "When I first saw the show it took my breath away. The storyline is iconic. The songs are just stunning, the orchestration is beautiful." Sheehy said: "The music we’re singing perfectly suits who we are as characters."

Subsequent productions
The first North American tour began at the Proctor's Theater in Schenectady, NY on 14 September 2013. The cast featured Steven Grant Douglas as Sam, Katie Postotnik as Molly, Robby Haltiwanger as Carl, and Carla R. Stewart as Oda Mae Brown. A debut season in Melbourne, Australia, had been confirmed to open in August 2013. The production was postponed due to "complications with transporting the famously technologically intricate set". The show eventually had an Australian premiere in 2016, opening in Adelaide before touring to Melbourne, Sydney and Perth. The cast featured Rob Mills as Sam and Jemma Rix as Molly.

A 2013 South Korean production starred Joo Won as Sam and Ivy as Molly. In 2014, Christian Bautista played Sam and Cris Villonco played Molly in the 2014 Manila production.

The English Theatre Frankfurt staged the German premiere of Ghost in November 2014. Aaron Sidwell played Carl.

An Asian tour was launched in 2015 in which starred Liam Doyle as Sam, Lucie Jones as Molly, and Andrew Langtree as Carl. There was a second Asian tour which began in 2016. Ghost has also played international destinations including Italy, Czech Republic and Singapore.

The German speaking premiere of Ghost was in 2017 in Linz, Austria. The production starred Riccardo Greco as Sam, Anaïs Lueken as Molly, Peter Lewys Preston as Carl and Ana Milva Gomes as Oda Mae.

The Russian premiere of Ghost took place on 7 October 2017 at the Moscow Youth Palace, starring Pavel Levkin as Sam, Galina Bezruk as Molly and Marina Ivanova as Oda Mae.

On 14 March 2019 Heltemus Production had the Danish premiere of Ghost with the original music, and with Danish translations of book and lyrics. The musical was directed and choreographed by Tobias Larsson and with set design by Rikke Juellund.

A French-language production of Ghost will open on 7 September 2019 at Théâtre Mogador in Paris.

A Japanese production of Ghost is scheduled to run from March 5 to March 23, 2021, at Theater Clie in Tokyo. The play will star Kenji Urai as Sam, Koki Mizuta as Carl, and Kumiko Mori as Oda Mae. Miyu Sakihi and Reika Sakurai are double-cast as Molly.

Musical numbers
In November 2010, four original songs from the musical were made available online from recording sessions at the Abbey Road Studios and the Manchester Exchange Theatre.

The event was recorded and exclusively screened for fans on Ghost'''s Facebook Page on 26 November 2010. The screenings were called 'Live & Unchained: The Facebook Sessions' and gave the world the first chance to hear the original songs. The whole footage is now available on YouTube. The original cast recording was released via iTunes on 17 July 2011. On the album, "Unchained Melody (Dance)" and "Finale" (labeled as "The Love Inside") are edited into one track.

Act I
 "Overture" – Orchestra
 "Here Right Now" – Molly, Sam, Carl
 "Unchained Melody" – Sam
 "More" – Carl, Ensemble
 "Three Little Words" – Molly, Sam
 "Ball of Wax" – Hospital Ghost, Ensemble≠
 "I Can't Breathe" – Sam≠≠
 "Are You a Believer?" – Clara, Louise, Mrs Santiago, Oda Mae
 "With You" – Molly
 "Suspend My Disbelief"/"I Had a Life" – Molly, Carl, Sam, Ensemble

Act II
 "Rain"/"Hold On" – Molly, Sam, Ensemble
 "Life Turns On a Dime" – Carl, Molly, Sam≠≠≠
 "Focus" – Subway Ghost
 "Talkin' 'Bout a Miracle" – Hospital Ghost, Oda Mae, Ensemble
 "Nothing Stops Another Day" – Molly
 "I'm Outta Here" – Oda Mae, Ensemble
 "Unchained Melody (Dance)" – Sam, Molly
 "Finale" – Sam, Molly

≠Replaced with "You Gotta Let Go" for Broadway and UK Tour. In the UK and US Tours, the role of Hospital Ghost is absent and the song is sung solely by the ensemble.≠≠Replaced with "Unchained Melody (Sam's Lament)" for the UK Tour and productions thereafter.≠≠≠Music and lyrical changes, mainly from "Here Right Now", implemented for Broadway and productions thereafter.

Principal roles and cast members
Listed below are the principal performers (of their respective productions) from all major productions of the musical.

Critical reception
Charles Isherwood, in his review of the Broadway production for The New York Times, called the musical a "thrill-free singing theme-park ride" and went on to write that "the show relies mostly on elaborate video imagery, modestly ingenious special effects and the familiarity of its ectoplasmic romance to entertain." Further, he believes that the musical has "innocuous, forgettable pop songs..."

The New York Daily News'' reviewer wrote that the "gee-whiz illusions (a specter seemingly walks through a door, for instance), lavish light displays and supersized projections are the main attractions of this English import. Without eye-popping tricks, the show offers zip in the way of wonder... [the] book... clunks along. The love story gets swamped by numerous scenes and robotic dance numbers about New York’s frantic fast-paced corporate jungle. Some moments seem to exist simply for visuals — Hey, let’s use umbrellas!"

In a more positive vein, the "talkinbroadway.com" reviewer wrote "Librettist-lyricist Bruce Joel Rubin ... and composer-lyricists Dave Stewart and Glen Ballard have written one of the finest film-to-stage adaptations in current memory, which Matthew Warchus has directed with energy and passion. Add in a better-than-necessary cast led by U.K. actor Richard Fleeshman and Caissie Levy ... both of whom originated their roles in London, and you have an evening that startles with just how good it is. In relative terms, at any rate. I'm not willing to go as far as saying that this is a great musical, or even an objectively good one... But it positively glows by the standards of all this Broadway season's new offerings and the likes of most other recent movie-inspired outings."

Cast Recordings
 2012 Ghost | Original London Cast
 2017 Ghost | Original Linz Cast
 2022 Ghost | German Tour Cast

Awards and nominations

Original London production

Original Broadway production

References

External links
 
 

2011 musicals
Musicals based on films
West End musicals
Broadway musicals
Musicals by David A. Stewart